Emmanuel Schwartz is a Canadian actor and playwright from Montreal, Quebec. He is most noted for his performance as Étienne Maltais in the film Hochelaga, Land of Souls (Hochelaga, terre des âmes), for which he won the Prix Iris for Best Supporting Actor at the 20th Quebec Cinema Awards in 2018.

The fluently bilingual son of a Jewish father and a Québécois mother, he performs in both English and French roles. He has appeared in the films Without Her (Sans elle), Laurence Anyways, Laurentia (Laurentie), L'Affaire Dumont, Nelly, Sashinka, We Are Gold (Nous sommes Gold), The Twentieth Century, Goddess of the Fireflies (La déesse des mouches à feu) and La Contemplation du mystère, and the television series Kif-Kif, Blue Moon, Sylvain le magnifique, L'Écrivain public and Lâcher prise.

In 2014 he was cowriter with Alexia Bürger of the theatrical play Alfred. In 2017, his theatrical piece Exhibition/L’Exhibition, co-created with Benoît Gob and Francis La Haye, premiered at Montreal's Festival TransAmériques. In 2020 he performed the role of the Librarian in a dual stage production of Glen Berger's play Underneath the Lintel, both in English for the Segal Centre for Performing Arts and in a French translation by Serge Lamothe for the Théâtre du Nouveau Monde.

References

External links

21st-century Canadian male actors
21st-century Canadian male writers
21st-century Canadian dramatists and playwrights
Canadian male dramatists and playwrights
Canadian male film actors
Canadian male television actors
Canadian male stage actors
Jewish Canadian male actors
Jewish Canadian writers
Male actors from Montreal
French Quebecers
Living people
Year of birth missing (living people)
Best Supporting Actor Jutra and Iris Award winners